A Scotsman is a man for Scotland.

Scotsman may also refer to:

 The Scotsman, a national newspaper based in Edinburgh, Scotland
 The Scotsman Hotel in Edinburgh, Scotland (formally the offices of The Scotsman)
 The Scotsman, the name of a character in the cartoon Samurai Jack
 "The Scotsman," a novelty song written by Mike Cross
 performed by Bryan Bowers on the Dr. Demento 20th Anniversary Collection album
 Studebaker Scotsman, an American economy car from the 1950s
 LNER Class A3 4472 Flying Scotsman, a 1923 4-6-2 tender locomotive

See also
 Scottish Civil War (disambiguation)
 Scottish Crown (disambiguation)
 Scottish Cup (disambiguation)
 Scottish language (disambiguation)
 Scottish people